Sydney Ellen Lucas (born July 11, 2003) is an American child actress with credits in musical theatre, film and television. She is best known for her portrayal of Small Alison Bechdel in both the original Off-Broadway and Broadway productions of Lisa Kron and Jeanine Tesori's musical Fun Home; she won an Obie Award and Theater World Award and received nominations for a Drama Desk Award and a Tony Award for Best Featured Actress in a Musical for her performance. She most recently starred in the main cast of AMC's western drama television series The Son as Jeannie McCullough.

Life and career
Born in Atlanta, Georgia, Sydney moved with her parents and two older brothers to New York City when she was two years old. Her parents run a software consulting company. In 2009, at age 6, Lucas underwent heart surgery to treat an atrial septal defect. Her older brother Jake Lucas is also a professional actor, and the two have appeared together in a commercial for Campbell’s Cream of Mushroom soup, and alongside Jennifer Aniston in the movie She's Funny That Way, which was released in 2015. She has studied acting with Diane Hardin and singing with Badiene Magaziner. She has also studied singing with her mother, Karri Lucas, who has a degree in vocal performance from DePauw University. She currently is a student in Manhattan.

In 2014, at the age of 10, Lucas became the youngest individual to win an Obie Award for her portrayal of Small Alison in the original Off-Broadway cast of Lisa Kron and Jeanine Tesori's musical Fun Home. That same year, she was also nominated for a Drama Desk Award, among other prestigious prizes. Lucas continued with the show when it moved to Broadway, winning a Theatre World Award, and receiving a nomination for a Tony Award for Best Featured Actress in a Musical in 2015 at the age of 11. Lucas left the company of Fun Home on October 4, 2015.

Lucas played Mary Lennox in The Secret Garden with Manhattan Concert Productions on February 21 and 22, 2016 at Lincoln Center’s David Geffen Hall.

Lucas has portrayed the younger version of two different characters played by Kristen Wiig in the films Girl Most Likely (2012) and The Skeleton Twins (2014). Her television credits include guest roles on Law & Order: Special Victims Unit, Royal Pains, Saturday Night Live, and Team Umizoomi. She has also appeared as Malcolm's Daughter in Giuseppe Verdi's Macbeth at the Metropolitan Opera in 2012.

Theatre credits

Filmography

Film

Television

Awards and nominations

References

External links

2003 births
Living people
Actresses from Atlanta
Actresses from New York City
American child actresses
American film actresses
American musical theatre actresses
American television actresses
American voice actresses
Obie Award recipients
Theatre World Award winners
21st-century American actresses